Eleonora Cortini (born 14 January 1992, in Trieste) is an Italian Soubrette, model, actress and television presenter.

Television

Filmography

Others

References

External links

Italian showgirls
Italian female models
21st-century Italian actresses
1992 births
Actors from Trieste
Italian television presenters
Living people
Italian women television presenters
Mass media people from Trieste